Hutchinson's facies is a facial appearance involving drooping eyelids and immobile eyes in external ophthalmoplegia. This sign is associated with neurosyphilis. It is named in honour of the English physician Jonathan Hutchinson (1828–1913).

References

External links
 Facies de Hutchinson o de la "mirada de la astrónomo", slide 16 of 42, slideshare.net, Diego Villarreal

Medical signs
Symptoms and signs: Nervous system
Disorders of ocular muscles, binocular movement, accommodation and refraction